Release early, release often (also known as ship early, ship often, or time-based releases, and sometimes abbreviated RERO) is a software development philosophy that emphasizes the importance of early and frequent releases in creating a tight feedback loop between developers and testers or users, contrary to a feature-based release strategy.  Advocates argue that this allows the software development to progress faster, enables the user to help define what the software will become, better conforms to the users' requirements for the software,
and ultimately results in higher quality software. The development philosophy attempts to eliminate the risk of creating software that no one will use.

This philosophy was popularized by Eric S. Raymond in his 1997 essay The Cathedral and the Bazaar, where Raymond stated "Release early. Release often. And listen to your customers".

This philosophy was originally applied to the development of the Linux kernel and other open-source software, but has also been applied to closed source, commercial software development.

The alternative to the release early, release often philosophy is aiming to provide only polished, bug-free releases. Advocates of RERO question that this would in fact result in higher-quality releases.

See also
 Worse is better
 Programming paradigm
 Software development process
 Agile software development
 Minimum viable product
 Vote early and vote often

References

External links
Release Early, Release Often, chapter of The Cathedral and the Bazaar by Eric S. Raymond

Software development philosophies
Software release